George Walcott (October 15, 1914 – August 18, 1964), also known as The Most Stylish Man in Hollywood, was an American actor. He was best known for playing the role of Tom in the 1936 film Fury.

Early life
Born in Los Angeles, California. Walcott began his career on stage, where he performed as a child. He began his film career in 1935, first appearing in the short film Hit-and-Run Driver in the role of George Lambert. In 1936, Walcott learned to fly an airplane and earned a pilot's license. In the same year Walcott co-starred as Tom in the film Fury.

Career
Walcott co-starred and made appearances in films, such as, Honeymoon in Bali, The Great Hospital Mystery, The Storm, Borrowing Trouble, Western Jamboree, The Great Victor Herbert, The Mandarin Mystery and The Forgotten Woman. In the film Born Reckless, he was credited as George Wolcott. Walcott played the role of actress, model and dancer Barbara Stanwyck's character brother "Charlie Martin" in the 1937 film Stella Dallas. He also co-starred in the 1938 film Cocoanut Grove, where Walcott played the role of "Tony Wonder" and starred with Fred MacMurray and Harriet Nelson. He appeared in the films Sailor's Lady, Submarine Raider, The Man Who Wouldn't Talk, Rhythm on the River and Buck Benny Rides Again. His last credit was from the 1942 film Quiet Please, Murder, where he played the uncredited role of "Benson".

Later life
Walcott retired from acting after World War II when he lost one of his legs, and worked as manager of United Artists theatres. Walcott died in August 1964 in Alameda, California, at the age of 49. Movie columnist and screenwriter Louella Parsons called him “the most stylish man in Hollywood“.

References

External links 

Rotten Tomatoes profile

1914 births
1964 deaths
People from Los Angeles
Male actors from Los Angeles
Male actors from California
American male stage actors
American male film actors
American male child actors
20th-century American male actors